Intercarpal ligament may refer to:

 Dorsal intercarpal ligament
 Interosseous intercarpal ligaments
 Palmar intercarpal ligaments